Ileibacterium is a genus from the family of Erysipelotrichidae.

References

Further reading 
 
 

Erysipelotrichia
Bacteria genera